"Wadde hadde dudde da?" (a derivative of the expression  "what do you have there?") was the  entry in the Eurovision Song Contest 2000, performed in an invented dialect of German by comedian Stefan Raab. The song was the fifteenth performed on the night, following 's Olsen Brothers with "Fly on the Wings of Love" and preceding 's Jane Bogaert with "La vita cos'è?". At the close of voting, it had received 96 points, placing fifth in a field of 24.

The idea of the song could have come from Raab's show TV total, where a short snippet from another TV-show shows a woman with her dog, which carries something in its mouth to her. In a childish cutesy dialect she asks the dog what he has there (in its mouth), hence the "Wadde hadde dudde da?".

Raab had previously written and composed Guildo Horn's "Guildo hat euch lieb!" for the 1998 contest, and "Wadde hadde dudde da?" is in a similar vein. The song opens with a monologue delivered in English and German in which Raab is described as "the sensational super sack of German television". Another voice explains in German that Raab had gone to America and promised, "if I make it there / I'm never coming back to Germany again".

Raab's appearance consists of a rapid-fire hip-hop-inspired delivery of tongue twisters in an invented German dialect on the general theme of questions about what "he has there". After the opening lines, a female vocalists asks in broken English "I am so curious, I just wanna know what you there have" (a reference to German word order). It is never revealed what Raab has there, but the final line "oh my God", implies that it is something surprising or obscene.

The performance at the Contest was flamboyant, with Raab and his guitarists dressed in cowboy hats, and the six-person ensemble all wearing bright yellow clothing. An excerpt of the performance appeared in a montage of "Unforgettable Performances" at the Congratulations special in late 2005.

It was succeeded as German representative at the 2001 contest by Michelle with "Wer Liebe lebt".

Charts

Year-end charts

References

Eurovision songs of Germany
Eurovision songs of 2000
German-language songs
Songs written by Stefan Raab
2000 songs
Macaronic songs